The 1952 Vermont gubernatorial election took place on November 4, 1952. Incumbent Republican Lee E. Emerson ran successfully for re-election to a second term as Governor of Vermont, defeating Democratic candidate Robert W. Larrow and write-in candidate Henry D. Vail.

Republican primary

Candidates
Lee E. Emerson, incumbent Governor of Vermont
Henry D. Vail, state senator

Endorsements

Results

Democratic primary

Results

General election

Results

References

Vermont
1952
Gubernatorial
November 1952 events in the United States